The  Iraqi 36th Commando Battalion (36th CDO BN) is one of several Iraqi Special Operations Units that have emerged since the fall of the Saddam Hussein regime. Originally part of the Iraqi Special Operations Forces Brigade (ISOF BDE), the unit has a role comparable to that of the United States Army Rangers in the War on terror. The unit is now designated the 1st Commando Battalion, part of the 1st Special Operations Brigade.

Commonly confused with other units that called themselves Commandos after the creation of the 36th Commandos; this unit is one of the most combat experienced/proven units in the new Iraqi Army.

History of the 36th CDO BN 
 On 25 November 2003 a decision was made between the Coalition Provisional Authority (CPA), the Commander United States Central Command (CDRCENTCOM), the Commander Combined Joint Task Force 7 (CDR CJTF-7), and the Iraqi Governing Council (IGC). These elements agreed to form a Baghdad-based, 500-man battalion by integrating militiamen from five (5) Political Parties: Iraqi National Accord (INA), Iraqi National Congress (INC), Kurdish Democratic Party (KDP), Patriotic Union of Kurdistan (PUK), and Supreme Council for Islamic Revolution in Iraq (SCIRI). The men would be well-trained, physically fit, and would serve the new Iraqi nation and not just one party. Although the battalion was created from its inception to be a special forces commando battalion that would conduct offensive operations, the decision was made to initially mask its purpose.  At the time, each U.S. Army division serving in Iraq was tasked to create Iraqi Civil Defense Corps (ICDC) units, and the composite commando unit creation was hidden in this effort.

As part of the CJSOTF-AP J-3, MAJ Ace was tasked to coordinate the creation of this battalion.  The members of this battalion would come from all over Iraq, although their base of operations would be in Baghdad.  As part of negotiations with 1st Armored Division (1 AD) to allow initial training and basing in their area of operations, it was agreed that the battalion would count against the thirty-six Iraqi Civil Defense Corps battalions that 1AD was tasked to create (of which only 18 had been created at this time). To cement the agreement, the battalion was given a unit designation as the 36th CICDC (Composite-ICDC).

The challenge was to have this unit operational in one month (26 December 2003). CDRCENTCOM tasked CJSOTF-AP to attach USSF advisors with this battalion and develop this new type of ICDC operations. FOB 51 1st Bn. 5th SFG (A) re-tasked AOB 520, ODB (-), three ODA's(-) and 1 full ODA from performing Unconventional Warfare(UW) and Direct Action (DA) missions to standing up the 36th ICDC Battalion. Split teams lined up with 4 Infantry Companies, plus a Scout and HQ Platoon; 521- A co., 523- B co., 524- C co., 533- D co., 533- Scouts and 520- HQ. AOB 520 CDR, MAJ John was the OIC with MSG Ron, 533 Team Sgt. as the NCOIC.

3 December 2003, the five Iraqi political parties sent their militiamen to Camp Dogwood, located approximately 20 km south of Baghdad, for 1 week of basic training. This phase consisted of unit assignment, medical screening, and basic soldier skills. After completion of this phase they moved to Camp Falcon, south Baghdad, where the unit received 2 weeks of Advanced Operations training. This phase focused on patrolling, CQB techniques, urban movement, and development of primary/subordinate leaders. Towards the end of this phase, ODA's 534 and 535 replaced the split teams from 521, 523 and 524; 535- A co., 535- B co., 533- C co., 533- D co., 534- Scouts and HQ. The Scout NCOIC was SFC Brett Walden, who paid the ultimate price for Iraq's Freedom in the summer of 2005 in the Nineveh Province on a separate engagement.

CJSOTF-AP met the timeline with the graduation of the 36th CICDC Bn. and A co. conducting the new fielded units first combat reconnaissance patrol on the night of the 26 December 2003. The Companies were assigned AO’s in Baghdad, which they relocated to with their split teams. The teams lived in the same quarters, eating, training and developing rapport with their assigned companies.

From 2004–2005, The 36th CICDC evolved into the 36th Commandos. Several ODAs served with them, to include; ODAs from 2nd Bn 5th Group, then 533/535/513 combined and some 10th Group teams. Over 1 year after graduation, they received the New Lithuanian uniforms (which they had been promised to receive at that graduation.) A 36th CICDC patch was made in the shape of Iraq using the colors of the Iraqi flag as a back drop and centered in green the number "36". In the summer of 2004, ODA 533's SFC Jade, SFC Steve and ODA 535's SSG Matt, developed Commando school located at FOB 51 Headquarters on the Baghdad International Airport (BIAP) grounds. The school was located on property that was once used by Saddam Hussein as a private zoo/Palace. The Commando School focused on CQB, marksmanship, hand-to-hand combat, objective infiltration (to include fast roping from helicopters) and the character development of leaders/subordinate leaders.

2005–2006 Special units within the 36th Commandos were formed and known as Special Recon Elements and  Scouts. These were Stood up by members of the 10th Special Forces and ODA's from 2nd BN 5th Special Forces group. ODA 542 and 543 Assisted and Advised the Commandos from Camp Justice and then relocated to area 4 at Baghdad International Airport (Biap).

2006 
Before the 36th Commandos, Iraq had no other unit named Commandos. As their AO opened and missions took them to all parts of Iraq, the media followed. The success of the unit became known throughout Iraq. Many units changed their name from Special Forces to Commandos, including police units and other militias.

History of C co. 36th CDO BN 
C co. 36th CICDC, found a home within the gates of the Ministry of Oil (MoO). On the backside of the grounds was a 3-storey building, which had been a day care for the children of the workers at the MOO. It had several rooms, multiple entrances and could be approached from several directions by multiple vehicles because of its location in the MoO parking lot. This served as an excellent training platform for CQB because this one building could be set up to mirror and be approached exactly like any target house/objective. Because most of the objectives were Raids, C co. 36th quickly adopted the name “Serriat Al Icktiham-Charlie” or Assault Company “Charlie”.

36th CDO BN Insignia (incomplete)

36th Commando Battalion Unit Patch 
The 36th Commando Bn. received a new unit patch badge, green and round in shape with an attacking eagle centered. This patch was worn on the left shoulder.

Commando School Badge 
Upon graduation from Commando School the Commando received the Commando badge similar to the 36th CDO BN Unit Patch, a green rectangle with an Eagle with spread wings centered on it and written in English and Arabic was the title Commando. The badge was worn over the left chest pocket.

A co. 36th CDO BN Insignia 
(Incomplete)

B co. 36th CDO BN Insignia 
(Incomplete)

C co. 36th CDO BN Insignia 
They developed a company patch and awards to signify unit members' experience. The Company patch was a maroon rectangle with a white skull and cross bones centered on the rectangle. Maroon/red in Iraq was traditionally used for Special Forces. The Company patch was made into a sign with, "Serriah Al Icktaham Charlie" written in Arabic on top and Assault Company "Charlie" written in English on the bottom. When a new recruit showed up to the unit they were given the C co. patch, which was placed above the left chest pocket and an Iraqi flag, placed on his right shoulder. When a Commando went on his 1st Combat Operation with the unit, he received a "Kawat Al Hassa" or "Special Forces" tab on his left shoulder. This was a tab used during the Saddam Regime. When a Commando went on his 1st "Iktaham" or "Assault/Raid", he was awarded a red shoulder lanyard, which was also used during the Saddam Regime, which was worn on his right shoulder.

D co. 36th CDO BN Insignia 
(Incomplete)

Scouts 36th CDO BN Insignia 
Scouts element 36th CDO BN Insignia was originally designed by SFC Chapman for graduation of the 36th Scout element from selection and assessment.

Operations (incomplete)

Baghdad 
Sadr City: (Incomplete)

Fallujah 
Operation Phantom Fury: Fallujah Hospital and follow-on targets

Samarra 
Golden Mosque: Assisted U.S. Special Forces stationed in Samarra with securing the Golden Mosque.

Najaf 
Imam Ali Mosque: (Incomplete)

Ar Ramadi 
7 Mosque Raid: (Incomplete)

Mosul 
(complete)

Tal Afar 
Note: Not the Police Commandos, or Wolf Brigade who also participated.(Incomplete)

Al Anbar 
Lake Tharthar Raid

Basra 
Operation Charge of the Knights

References 

 Official 5th SFG (A), After Action Review (AAR) of the task to stand up the 36th Commando Battalion

External links 
 
 
 
 ShadowSpear Special Operations

Special forces of Iraq
3